The Royal Road is a 2015 documentary film directed by Jenni Olson. The film premiered in the New Frontier section of the 2015 Sundance Film Festival. In the film's voiceover, Olson reflects on her butch identity and experiences of unrequited love. The film went on to earn the award for Best LGBTQ Film at the 2015 Ann Arbor Film Festival. Consisting entirely of 16mm urban landscape shots and a lyrical stream of consciousness voiceover, the film touches on a wide range of topics from reflections on classic Hollywood film to the history of the Spanish colonization of California and the Mexican American War. A voiceover cameo appearance by Pulitzer Prize-winning playwright Tony Kushner serves as the centerpiece for the film's focal point segment entitled, "In Defense of Nostalgia."

Production
Olson cited Sherman's March and Alfred Hitchcock's Vertigo as influences. San Francisco Film Society was the film's fiscal sponsor. The film had its Bay Area premiere on April 29, 2015 at the SFFS's San Francisco International Film Festival. Olson also crowdfunded $24,038 towards the production of the film. Olson's wife, Julie Dorf, produced the film.

Reception
Of the film, Dennis Harvey wrote in Variety that "The pic could hardly be smaller or quieter by conventional standards, assembly on all levels is serenely accomplished."

References

External links
The Royal Road on the Internet Movie Database
Official website

2015 documentary films
2015 films
American documentary films
Butch and femme
Documentary films about lesbians
American LGBT-related films
Documentary films about San Francisco
American avant-garde and experimental films
LGBT culture in San Francisco
2015 LGBT-related films
2010s avant-garde and experimental films
Films shot in 16 mm film
2010s English-language films
2010s American films